Neblinichthys is a small genus of suckermouth armored catfishes native to South America.

Species 
There are currently six recognized species in this genus:
 Neblinichthys brevibracchium Taphorn, Armbruster, López-Fernández & C. R. Bernard, 2010
 Neblinichthys echinasus Taphorn, Armbruster, López-Fernández & C. R. Bernard, 2010
 Neblinichthys peniculatus Armbruster & Taphorn, 2013
 Neblinichthys pilosus Ferraris, Isbrücker & Nijssen, 1986
 Neblinichthys roraima Provenzano, Lasso & Ponte, 1995
 Neblinichthys yaravi (Steindachner, 1915)

Etymology
According to FishBase, Neblinichthys is derived from the Latin nebula which means mist or vapor, and ichthys for fish. However, it has been stated by some sources that Neblinichthys actually owes its name to a base camp known as Neblina ("fog" in Spanish) where the type specimen of N. pilosus, the type species of the genus, was reportedly collected. The camp that the genus was named for is likely named after the Cerro de la Neblina, which is a prominent sandstone massif in the area, and documentation of nearby base camps named for the massif exists.

The authors of the description of N. pilosus state that Neblinichthys derives its name from the type locality, which is listed as the massif itself rather than a camp located nearby, an explanation which should be taken as the correct etymology for the genus as it is included in its original description. This means that an accurate translation of the genus' name is "fish from the Cerro de la Neblina", even though not all species in the genus are found in the area, with some being found in entirely different countries and river systems from N. pilosus.

Appearance and anatomy
Neblinichthys species are unique in that the breeding males have a snout brush formed by elongate, bristle-like odontodes pointing forwards on the snout. More fairly elongated odontodes are found on the top of the head and on the body. Otherwise they appear rather similar to Lasiancistrus species. Females and juveniles may be differentiated from Lasiancistrus species by the lack of cheek whiskers. Neblinichthys species also have their pectoral fin and pelvic fin spines the same length.

References

Ancistrini
Fish of South America
Fish of Venezuela
Catfish genera
Taxa named by Isaäc J. H. Isbrücker
Taxa named by Han Nijssen
Freshwater fish genera